PBA Galleries is a San Francisco auction house specializing in rare books, manuscripts, maps and atlases, photographs, golf books, Americana, modern literature and related materials. PBA conducts approximately twenty-five gallery auctions in a calendar year

History 
PBA was founded in 1992 by former employees of California Book Auction Galleries, which closed following the passing of its founder, Maurice F. Powers. PBA Galleries was first located at 139 Townsend Street, in the SOMA area of San Francisco (just a block away from the present location of ATT Park, home of the San Francisco Giants). In the spring of 1996 the company moved to its current location, 1233 Sutter Street in San Francisco’s Financial District, the former premises of the defunct sports memorabilia auctioneer Richard Wolffer's Auctions, Inc. PBA was purchased by its current owner Sharon Gee in January 2013.

References

 Disputed Alcatraz invasion flag on block 
 Youtube archives
 Edwin Blair Sale of Beat Literature
 Lewis and Clark's History Sells for $212,000

External links 
 http://www.pbagalleries.com
 http://www.bibliobot.com

Companies based in San Francisco
American companies established in 1992
Retail companies established in 1992
American auction houses